The Black Bridge is a Russian partisan movement opposed to the rule of Vladimir Putin. The organization supports the territorial integrity of Ukraine.

History 
In August 2022, the movement made recommendations to disrupt referendums on the annexation of the occupied parts of Ukraine to Russia.

After the announcement of the mobilization in Russia, the movement stated that: "the regime has chosen a quick death through agony. ... This is good, because the push-and-pull on the Ukrainian front ends and the under-reich will fall faster. It’s bad - because the partisan movement did not have time to properly take shape and the regime would still have time to send several tens of thousands of mobilized for fertilizer. ”

References 

Opposition to Vladimir Putin
Insurgent groups in Europe
Resistance during the 2022 Russian invasion of Ukraine
Organizations established in 2022